Kristeller is a German surname. Notable people with the surname include:

Paul Kristeller (1863–1931), German art historian
Paul Oskar Kristeller (1905–1999), German-born American historian of philosophy
 (1820–1900), German gynaecologist

See also
Kristeller (grape), another name for the German wine grape Elbling

German-language surnames